The World Heavyweight Championship was a professional wrestling world heavyweight championship owned by WWE. It was one of two top championships in WWE from 2002 to 2006 and from 2010 to 2013, complementing the WWE Championship, and one of three top championships from 2006 to 2010 with the addition of the ECW World Heavyweight Championship.

The title was established under the Raw brand in 2002, after Raw and SmackDown became distinct brands under WWE, and moved between both brands on different occasions (mainly as a result of the WWE draft) until August 29, 2011, when all programming became full roster "supershows". The World Heavyweight Championship was retired at TLC: Tables, Ladders & Chairs on December 15, 2013, when it was unified with the WWE Championship. Triple H was the inaugural World Heavyweight Champion, with Randy Orton being the last champion.

The title was one of six to be represented by the historic Big Gold Belt, first introduced in 1986. Its heritage can be traced back to the first world heavyweight championship, thereby giving the belt a legacy over 100 years old, the oldest in the world.

History

Background 
The title's origins lay in the first world heavyweight championship, and then to events that began in the National Wrestling Alliance (NWA), which had many different territorial promotions as members. In the late 1980s, World Championship Wrestling (WCW) was a member of the NWA, having been formed by the purchase of Jim Crockett Promotions (JCP), which had absorbed many other NWA members, by Turner Broadcasting, which aired WCW's programming. During this time, WCW used the NWA World Heavyweight Championship as its world title. The WCW World Heavyweight Championship was soon established when the recognition was awarded to then-NWA World Heavyweight Champion Ric Flair in 1991. In 1993, WCW seceded from the NWA and grew to become a rival promotion to the World Wrestling Federation (WWF), itself a former member of the NWA. Both organizations grew into mainstream prominence and were eventually involved in a television ratings war dubbed the Monday Night Wars. Near the end of the ratings war, WCW began a financial decline which culminated in March 2001 with the WWF's purchase of selected assets of WCW.

As a result of the purchase, the WWF acquired the video library of WCW, select talent contracts, and championships among other assets. The slew of former WCW talent joining the WWF roster began "The Invasion" that effectively phased out the WCW name. Following this, the WCW World Heavyweight Championship was unified with the WWF Championship, the WWF's world title, at Vengeance in December. At the event, the WCW World Heavyweight Championship was decommissioned with Chris Jericho becoming the final WCW World Heavyweight Champion and the subsequent Undisputed WWF Champion after defeating The Rock and Steve Austin respectively. The WWF title became the undisputed championship in professional wrestling until September 2002 with the creation of the World Heavyweight Championship, spun off from the Undisputed WWE Championship as the successor to the WCW World Heavyweight Championship.

Creation 

By 2002, WWE's roster had doubled in size due to the overabundance of contracted workers. As a result of the increase, WWE divided the roster through its two main television programs, Raw and SmackDown, assigning championships and appointing figureheads to each brand of the same name. This expansion became known as the "Brand Extension".  In May 2002, the WWF was renamed to World Wrestling Entertainment (WWE). Following these changes, the Undisputed WWE Championship remained unaffiliated with either brand as competitors from both brands could challenge the Undisputed Champion. Following the appointment of Eric Bischoff and Stephanie McMahon as General Managers of the Raw and SmackDown brands, respectively, Stephanie McMahon contracted then-WWE Undisputed Champion Brock Lesnar to the SmackDown brand, leaving the Raw brand without a world title. On September 2, Eric Bischoff announced the creation of the World Heavyweight Championship. Bischoff awarded the title to Triple H, who had been designated number-one contender to Lesnar's title the previous week. Immediately afterwards, the Undisputed Championship returned to being the WWE Championship as it was no longer undisputed. The World Heavyweight Championship and the WWE Championship switched brands a number of times before the first brand split ended in 2011.

Historical lineage 

While introduced in 2002 as a new title, the WWE often made allusions to other titles including those of WCW and the NWA, amalgamating the history of the championship with the history of the belt that represents it. As affirmed by WWE, the World Heavyweight Championship is not a continuation of the WCW Championship, but rather its successor by way of the WWE Undisputed Championship, just as the WCW Championship spun off from the NWA World Heavyweight Championship. Due to its relation to both titles, its lineage is connected with the earliest recognized world heavyweight championship. In 2009, WWE released a DVD set called History of the World Heavyweight Championship that definitively linked the title to the WCW and NWA titles.

Title unification

Following the end of the first brand extension in 2011, both the World Heavyweight Champion and WWE Champion could appear on both Raw and SmackDown. In 2013, the night after Survivor Series, then-World Heavyweight Champion John Cena made a challenge to then-WWE Champion Randy Orton to determine an undisputed WWE world champion. Randy Orton defeated John Cena in a TLC match at the TLC: Tables, Ladders & Chairs pay-per-view on December 15, 2013, to unify the titles. Subsequently, the WWE Championship was renamed WWE World Heavyweight Championship. The unified championship retained the lineage of the WWE Championship, and the World Heavyweight Championship was retired. With his victory over John Cena, Randy Orton became the final World Heavyweight Champion. Like with the Undisputed Championship, the Big Gold Belt was used in tandem with the WWE Championship belt to represent the WWE World Heavyweight Championship until a single belt was presented to then champion Brock Lesnar in August 2014.

Brand designation history 
The following is a list of dates indicating the transitions of the World Heavyweight Championship between the Raw and SmackDown brands.

Reigns 

The inaugural champion was Triple H, and there were 25 different champions overall. The longest reigning champion was Batista who held the title from April 3, 2005, to January 10, 2006, for a total of 282 days. Triple H holds the record for longest combined reigns at 616 days. The shortest reigning champion was Randy Orton in his fourth reign, who immediately retired the championship upon winning it and unifying it with the WWE Championship. He was also the youngest champion, at the age of 24. The oldest champion was The Undertaker who won at the age of 44. Edge held the title the most times with seven championship reigns. There were six vacancies throughout the title's history.

Randy Orton was the final champion in his fourth reign. He defeated John Cena in a Tables, Ladders and Chairs match at TLC in Houston, Texas on December 15, 2013 to unify the WWE and World Heavyweight Championships.

See also
 List of former championships in WWE
 World championships in WWE

Notes

References

External links 
 Official WWE World Heavyweight Title History
 Wrestling-Titles.com: World Heavyweight Title (WWE)

World heavyweight wrestling championships
WWE championships